National Association of the Deaf may refer to:

 National Association of the Deaf (Italy)
 National Association of the Deaf (India)
 National Association of the Deaf (United States)
 National Deaf Federation Nepal